Andrew Sumner is a British movie journalist, editor, TV presenter and company director.

Sumner wrote for the comics news magazine Speakeasy in the 1980s. He was a movie journalist for the NME, Vox and Total Film throughout the 1990s and wrote regularly for Uncut. Sumner published various magazines for Emap before joining IPC as publisher of Loaded and Uncut. He launched Uncut DVD  and later published Now magazine. Sumner presented The Uncut Film on Turner Classic Movies, a series of contemporary classic movies curated by Uncut that ran on TCM UK at 9pm Wednesdays.

During his time at IPC, Sumner revived Fleetway's classic British comics library, overseeing Dirk Maggs' Adventures of Sexton Blake for BBC Radio 2, co-publishing (with DC Comics) Leah Moore, John Reppion and Shane Oakley's Albion; Dave Gibbons and John Higgins' Thunderbolt Jaxon; and Garth Ennis and Colin Wilson's Battler Britton. He curated Titan Books' reprint archive editions The King of Crooks, The Steel Claw, and Albion Origins.

Sumner left IPC to serve as Directeur Général of Cahiers du Cinéma (during its transition from Le Monde to Phaidon Press) and currently serves as EVP of the international Titan Entertainment Group, running their movie/music merchandise division, editing the Mike Hammer novels written by Max Allan Collins and hosting their Forbidden Planet TV channel.

References

British male journalists
Living people
Year of birth missing (living people)